Dabudasht (formerly, Darvish Kheyl (Persian: درويش خيل), also Romanized as Darvīsh Kheyl) is a city and capital of Dabudasht District, in Amol County, Mazandaran Province, Iran.  At the 2006 census, its population was 1,096, in 300 families.  
Dabu Rice is most of goods Iranian raised.

References

Populated places in Amol County
Cities in Mazandaran Province
Settled areas of Elburz